The 1999 USL Premier Development League season was the 5th PDL season. The season began in April 1999 and ended in August 1999.

Chicago Sockers finished the season as national champions, beating Spokane Shadow 3-1 in the PDL Championship game. Jackson Chargers had finished with the best regular season record in the league, winning 14 out of their 16 games, suffering just two losses, and finishing with a +55 goal difference.

Changes from 1998 season

Name changes
 Abbotsford Athletes In Action changed their name to the Abbotsford 86ers Select.
 Central Florida Lionhearts changed their name to the Central Florida Kraze.
 Fox River Rebels changed their name to the Wisconsin Rebels.
 Grand Rapids Explosion changed their name to West Michigan Explosion.
 Seattle Hibernians changed their name to Seattle Sounders Select.

New teams 
18 teams were added for the season, including 7 expansion teams and four who had returned from hiatus.

Teams leaving
5 teams folded after the 1998 Season:
 Detroit Dynamite
 Lansing Locomotive
 Northern Arizona Prospectors
 Seattle BigFoot
 Southern California Chivas

Alabama Saints and South Florida Future went on hiatus for this season.

Okanagan Valley Challenge and Victoria Umbro Select returned to the PCSL, ending their associate membership. Abbotsford Athletes In Action and Seattle Hibernian retained their membership.

Standings

Central Conference

Great Lakes Division

Heartland Division

Eastern Conference

Northeast Division

Southeast Division

Western Conference

Northwest Division

Southwest Division

Playoffs 
Spokane hosted the Finals and received a bye to the National Semi-Finals.

References

1999
4
1999 in Canadian soccer